Budimirci is a small village in the Mariovo region, in the municipality of Novaci, North Macedonia. It used to be part of the former municipality of Staravina.

Demographics
According to the 2002 census, the village had a total of 30 inhabitants. Ethnic groups in the village include:

Macedonians 30

References

External links

 Budimirci website

Villages in Novaci Municipality